The 2010–11 Liga IV was the fourth level of the Romanian football league system. It was disputed in each of the 41 counties of Romania and in the municipality of Bucharest. The winner of each series has to play a promotion play-off against a neighbouring county to gain promotion to Liga III.

Promotion play-off

The matches was scheduled to be played on 15 June 2011.

|-

|}

County leagues

Alba County

Arad County

Argeș County

Bacău County 

Relegation play-off 
The 15th and 16th-placed teams of the Liga IV faces the 2nd placed teams from the two series of Liga V Bacău.

|}

Bihor County

Bistrița-Năsăud County 

Relegation play-off 
The 14th and 15th-placed teams of the Liga IV faces the 2nd placed teams from the two series of Liga V Bistrița-Năsăud.

Botoșani County 

Relegation play-off 
The 11th and 12th-placed teams of the Liga IV faces the 2nd placed teams from the two series of Liga V Botoșani.

Brașov County

Brăila County

Bucharest 
Series I

Series II

Series III

First play-off 
Group 1

 Group 2

Group 3

Second play-off 
Group 1

Group 2

Final 

Metaloglobus București won the 2010–11 Liga IV Bucharest and qualify to promotion play-off in Liga III.

Buzău County 
Series I

Series II 

Series III

Championship play-off

Călărași County 
Series A 

Series B

Series C

Championship play-off
First round  

Second round 

Third round

Semifinals 

Final
The championship final was played on 4 June 2011 at Prefab Stadium in Modelu.

Venus Independența won the 2010–11 Liga IV Călărași County and qualify to promotion play-off in Liga III.

Caraș-Severin County

Cluj County 

Championship play-off 

Relegation play-out

Constanța County 
East Series

West Series

Championship play-off 
The teams from the West series started the play-off with all the records achieved in the regular season and the teams from East series started the play-off without the results against Aurora 23 August. The reason is the difference of matches played between the two series, 22 in the East and 20 in the West. The teams played only against the teams from the other series

Championship play-out 
The teams started the play-out with all the records achieved in the regular season and played only against the teams from the other series.

Covasna County

Dâmbovița County

Dolj County 

Championship play-off

Galați County

Giurgiu County 

Championship play-off 
The championship play-off played between the best four ranked team in the regular season. All matches were played at Dunărea-Port Stadium on 4 and 5 June (semi-finals) and 9 June 2011 (final).
Semi-finals

Final

Rapid Clejani won the 2010–11 Liga IV Giurgiu County and qualify to promotion play-off in Liga III.

Gorj County

Harghita County

Hunedoara County

Ialomița County

Iași County

Ilfov County 

Championship play-off 
Championship play-off played in a single round-robin tournament between the best four teams of the regular season. The teams started the play-off with the following points: 1st place – 3 points, 2nd place – 2 points, 3rd place – 1 point, 4th place – 0 points.

Maramureș County 
North Series

South Series

Championship final 

Marmația Sighetu Marmației won the 2010–11 Liga IV Maramureș County and qualify to promotion play-off in Liga III.

Mehedinți County

Mureș County

Neamț County

Olt County

Prahova County

Satu Mare County 
Series A

Series B ====

Championship final 
The championship final was played on 5 June 2011 at Olimpia Stadium in Satu Mare.

Olimpia Satu Mare won the 2010–11 Liga IV Satu Mare County and qualify to promotion play-off in Liga III.

Sălaj County

Sibiu County

Suceava County

Teleorman County

Timiș County

Tulcea County

Vaslui County 
North Series

South Series

Championship play-off

Vâlcea County

Vrancea County 
North Series 

South Series

Championship play-off 
Semi-finals

Final

Național Golești won the 2010–11 Liga IV Vrancea County and qualify to promotion play-off in Liga III.

See also
 2010–11 Liga I
 2010–11 Liga II
 2010–11 Liga III

References

External links
 Official website 

Liga IV seasons
4
Romania